Chaba River may refer to:

 Chaba River (Canada), a river in Alberta, Canada 
 Chaba River (China), a river in Chongqing Municipality, China